Alexandr Dyachenko (born 23 October 1980) is a Kazakhstani beach volleyball player. He competed at the 2012 Asian Beach Games in Haiyang, China.

References

External links
 
 

1980 births
Living people
Kazakhstani beach volleyball players
Asian Games medalists in beach volleyball
Asian Games gold medalists for Kazakhstan
Beach volleyball players at the 2010 Asian Games
Beach volleyball players at the 2014 Asian Games
Place of birth missing (living people)
Medalists at the 2014 Asian Games
21st-century Kazakhstani people